Frankie Ballard is the debut album by the American country music singer of the same name. It was released on May 24, 2011 (see 2011 in country music) via Reprise Records Nashville.

Content
The album includes the singles "Tell Me You Get Lonely" and "A Buncha Girls", both of which charted within the top 40 of Hot Country Songs.

Critical reception

The album was rated three stars out of five on Allmusic, with reviewer Thom Jurek saying that it "doesn't have any inherently weak tracks, but it doesn't possess any extraordinarily strong ones, either." He thought that "A Buncha Girls" was the strongest song on the album, and that many of the songs showed a John Mellencamp influence. Bobby Peacock of Roughstock gave it 4 out of 5 stars, saying that "all eight songs are finely written and finely sung, showcasing his raw, gritty voice. The production is radio-friendly but still crisp, energetic and rocking, adding a high energy level to even the slower songs."

Track listing

Chart performance

References

2011 debut albums
Frankie Ballard albums
Reprise Records albums
Albums produced by Michael Knox (record producer)